Senator Parmenter may refer to:

Ezra Parmenter (1823–1873), Massachusetts State Senate
Roswell A. Parmenter (1821–1904), New York State Senate
William Parmenter (1789–1866), Massachusetts State Senate